Lincoln County is a county located in the U.S. state of Wisconsin. As of the 2020 census, the population was 28,415. Its county seat is Merrill. The county was created in 1875 and named after President Abraham Lincoln.

Lincoln County comprises the Merrill, WI Micropolitan Statistical Area, which is also included in the Wausau-Stevens Point-Wisconsin Rapids, WI Combined Statistical Area.

Geography

Adjacent counties
 Oneida County - north
 Langlade County - east
 Marathon County - south
 Taylor County - west
 Price County - northwest

Major highways
  U.S. Highway 8
  U.S. Highway 51
  Highway 17 (Wisconsin)
  Highway 64 (Wisconsin)
  Highway 86 (Wisconsin)
  Highway 107 (Wisconsin)

Railroads
Tomahawk Railway
Watco

Buses
List of intercity bus stops in Wisconsin

Airports
 KRRL - Merrill Municipal Airport
 KTKV - Tomahawk Regional Airport

Demographics

2020 census
As of the census of 2020, the population was 28,415. The racial makeup of the county was 94.7% White, 0.6% Black or African American, 0.4% Native American, 0.4% Asian, 0.6% from other races, and 3.3% from two or more races. Ethnically, the population was 1.9% Hispanic or Latino of any race.

2000 census

As of the census of 2000, there were 29,641 people, 11,721 households, and 8,228 families residing in the county. The population density was 34 people per square mile (13/km2). There were 14,681 housing units at an average density of 17 per square mile (6/km2). The racial makeup of the county was 97.76% White, 0.41% Black or African American, 0.44% Native American, 0.39% Asian, 0.03% Pacific Islander, 0.29% from other races, and 0.68% from two or more races. 0.82% of the population were Hispanic or Latino of any race. 55.9% were of German, 5.7% Polish and 5.3% Norwegian ancestry. 96.9% spoke English, 1.3% German and 1.2% Spanish as their first language.

There were 11,721 households, out of which 31.40% had children under the age of 18 living with them, 58.40% were married couples living together, 8.10% had a female householder with no husband present, and 29.80% were non-families. 25.50% of all households were made up of individuals, and 12.10% had someone living alone who was 65 years of age or older. The average household size was 2.46 and the average family size was 2.94.

In the county, the population was spread out, with 25.40% under the age of 18, 6.90% from 18 to 24, 28.00% from 25 to 44, 23.30% from 45 to 64, and 16.40% who were 65 years of age or older. The median age was 39 years. For every 100 females there were 99.90 males. For every 100 females age 18 and over, there were 95.10 males.

In 2017, there were 270 births, giving a general fertility rate of 62.6 births per 1000 women aged 15–44, the 34st lowest rate out of all 72 Wisconsin counties. Additionally, there were 17 reported induced abortions performed on women of Lincoln County residence in 2017.

Politics

See also
 National Register of Historic Places listings in Lincoln County, Wisconsin

References

External links
 Lincoln County
 Lincoln County Interactive Maps

Resources
 Libraries and Schools in Marathon and Lincoln Counties :
This digital collection contains historic images and texts that document central Wisconsin schools and libraries in Marathon and Lincoln Counties. Text-based materials include: Marchetti, Louis. History of the Public Library Building and Names of Donors, 1909, a record of the proceedings, leading up, and culminating in the erection and completion of the Library Building of the city of Wausau, with names of Donors attached thereto. Compiled and presented to the Library by Louis Marchetti, President of the Library Board from 1904 to 1908.

 
1875 establishments in Wisconsin
Populated places established in 1875